Moel is a variant spelling for:
Mohel, the person performing the Jewish ritual of circumcision
Saint Mel, a 5th-century Irish religious figure
In Welsh placenames, it means a bare hill.